Stonehaven Football Club are a Scottish Junior football club from Stonehaven, Aberdeenshire. The club currently play in the McBookie.com SJFA North Superleague.

History 
Stonehaven Football Club were founded in 1919 and the clubs' home ground is Glenury Park. The Club colours are royal blue with white trim on the shirts and shorts, with a change kit of yellow and black vertical striped shirts with black shorts and black socks. The Club changed to these back in the late 1980s following the appointment of long-standing manager Derek Allan.

2009–2010 
At the end of the 2009–10 SJFA North Division One season, second placed Inverness City were denied promotion after failing to secure a suitable home ground. The decision was made for third placed Stonehaven to play-off against Buchanhaven Hearts who finished 13th in the North Superleague to decide the second promotion/relegation spot. Stonehaven won 3–2 at Heathryfold Park, Aberdeen to secure promotion.

2010–2011 
The Hive retained their Superleague status the following season under the guidance, for part of the season at least, of new management duo Richard Craig and Derek Craigie before they took over the reins at Superleague rivals Sunnybank. Former manager Derek Allan stepped into the breach in December 2011 with assistance from former Cove Rangers, Huntly and Peterhead midfielder Doug Baxter.

2011–2012 
Just a couple of months into the 2011–2012 season Baxter was handed sole charge of the side and along with assistant manager Sandy McNaughton led the side to second in the PMAC Superleague and to the McBookie.com McLeman Cup.

2012–2013 
Despite this success Baxter and McNaughton opted to move to pastures new in October 2012 and they took over at rivals Banks o'Dee.

It was Derek Allan who would fill the managerial position again, with assistance initially from former Banchory St Ternan manager Steve Scott and latterly Ian Esslemont. Due to work commitments Allan was to step down again in early 2013 but that did not deter Esslemont and the team as, despite a 7th place Superleague finish, they achieved yet more silverware success as they clinched the Domino's Pizza North Regional Cup with a 3–1 win over Maud at Ian Mair Park.

2013–2014 
The following season was one of transition, with seven of the previous season's squad leaving the club. Max Alexander, Sean Croll, Ross Forsyth, Keith Horne, Michael Smith and Ryan Stewart left for Banks o' Dee, and Callum Murray joined Hermes.

Danny Anderson, Tim Capstick, Kevin Davidson, Shaun Goate, Justin Knowles, Michael Mathieson, Grant Moorhouse, the Hive's first ever Lithuanian Valentinas Sulkevicius, and Graeme Wilson came in to replace those who departed, and despite two opening Superleague defeats the team were soon top of the table. Ultimately it was too much of an ask to stay in pole position, with an eventual second successive 7th place finish.

Club officials

Management 

 Manager: Martyn Rollo
 Assistant Manager: Paul Mitchell
 Coach: Kris Petty
 U21’s Manager: Daniel Middler
 Player/Coach: Ludi Metelski
 Goalkeeping Coach: Spud and Lee Thompson

Committee 

 Chairman: Ken Scott
 Secretary: Neale Scott
 Treasurer: Chuck Thorn
 Graham Anderson
 Kenny Black
 Brian Birss

Squad

Honours

 Scottish Junior Football North First Division winners: 2021-22
 SJFA North East Premier Division winners: 1989–90, 1993–94
 SJFA North East Division One winners: 1988–89
 Scottish Junior Football North Super League: Runners-up 2011–12
 Morrison Trophy: 1981–82, 1984–85, 2009–10, 2021–22
 North (Norsco) Regional Cup: 1990–91
 Duthie (Acorn Heating) Cup: 1963–64, 1968–69, 1993–94
 McLeman Cup: 1972–73, 1987–88, 1994–95, 2011–2012
 Aberdeen & District Junior League Cup: 1962–63, 1963–64
 Jimmy Gibb Memorial Trophy: 1989–90
 Domino's Pizza North Regional Cup: 2012–13

Notable former players

References

External links
 Stonehaven Football Club Official Site

Sources
 Scottish Football Historical Archive
 Non-league Scotland

Football clubs in Scotland
Scottish Junior Football Association clubs
Football in Aberdeenshire
Association football clubs established in 1919
1919 establishments in Scotland
Stonehaven